is a male Japanese animator, storyboard artist, and animation director.

Biography 
He worked on "Bit the Cupid" and "Hare Tokidoki Buta” at Group TAC before leaving the company in 1998 to start his own business. He has worked in animation and direction since about 2000, primarily for Madhouse productions (MADHOUSE Inc.). In 2003's "Narutaru," he worked as a character designer. In 2006's "Yoake Mae yori Ruriiro na: Crescent Love" he made his directorial debut. He has since transitioned to directing, concentrating on Dome and Doga Kobo's anime. Since appointing Takashi Aoshima as his first director in 2006, he has also employed Takaharu Okuma as an assistant director or character designer and Yasuhiro Misawa as the composer for all of his productions.

Work Process 
He starts by reading over the original story, regardless of the number of books. After reading, he decides how much he will animate the original story into animation before discussing the original work and animation production with the main staff. 

The most important consideration when creating an animation is the original story’s content, which captures all the details in a novel or story that are unrealistic and impossible to represent through a single image. He is cautious about drawing the facial expressions and reactions of animated characters, as it might affect the emotional state or the intention of the author and the settings of the original character. He considers which part of the novel will be included as an episode of animation since fans of the original work will have variations of their favorite scenes. This causes the animation to be completely different from the original story or novel.

Works (as animator) 

 Tatchi: Sebangô no nai êsu (1986)
 Tatchi 2: Sayonara no Okurimono (1986)
 Tatchi 3: Kimi ga tôrisugita ato ni (1987)
 Murasaki Shikibu: Genji Monogatori (1987)
 Fushigi no umi no Nadia: Gekijô-yô orijinaru-ban (1991)
 Licca-chan to Yamaneko Hoshi no Tabi (1994)
 Tenchi Muyô! Manatsu no Eve (1997) 
 Superman: The Animated Series (1998)
 Tatchi: Are kara kimi wa … Miss Lonely Yesterday (1998)
 Grandeek - Gaiden (2000)
 Touch: Cross Road (2001)
 X (2001)
 Strawberry Marshmallow (Ichigo mashimaro) (2005)
 Rozario to banpaia (2008)
 Mitsudomoe (2010)
 Sabagebu! (2014)

Works (as director)
Yoake Mae yori Ruriiro na: Crescent Love (2006)
Minami-ke (2007)
Mitsudomoe (2010)
YuruYuri (2011)
YuruYuri♪♪ (2012)
Kotoura-san (2013)
Love Lab (2013)
Sabagebu! (2014)
Himouto! Umaru-chan (2015)
Hagane Orchestra (2016)
Gabriel DropOut (2017)
Himouto! Umaru-chan R (2017)
Uchi no Maid ga Uzasugiru! (2018)
Didn't I Say to Make My Abilities Average in the Next Life?! (2019)
Onipan! (2022)

Works (as storyboard artist) 

 Mai-HiMe (2004)
 Elemental gelade (2005)
 Shuffle! (2005)
 Minami-ke (2007)
 Toraburu (2008)
 Mitsudomoe (2010)
 Kotoura-san (2013)
 Love Lab (2013)
 Sabagebu! (2014)
 Himouto! Umaruchan (2015)
 Gabriel DropOut (2017)
 Uchi no Maid ga Uzasugiru (2018)

References

External links

Anime directors
Living people
Year of birth missing (living people)